Guihua can refer to

 Osmanthus fragrans
 a part of Hohhot, Inner Mongolia, China
 Guihua Subdistrict, a subdistrict of Hetang District, Zhuzhou, Hunan, China